The 1991 Kangaroo tour of Papua New Guinea was a two-week, end of season tour of Papua New Guinea by the Australia national rugby league team. The Australians played five matches on the tour, including two Test matches against the Papua New Guinea national rugby league team. The tour began on 29 September and finished on 13 October.

As of 2017 this remains the only full Kangaroo Tour of Papua New Guinea.

Leadership
As he had been since 1989, Bob Fulton was the coach of the Kangaroos. Mal Meninga was the team captain.

Touring squad
Eleven of the 23 man squad had played for Australia in their 2-1 Trans-Tasman Test series win over New Zealand earlier in the year. Among those selected to tour but who were ultimately ruled out with injury were Penrith test players and 1991 premiership winners Greg Alexander, Mark Geyer and John Cartwright as well as Canberra Raiders halves Laurie Daley and Ricky Stuart.

|- bgcolor="#CCCCFF"
| Player
| Club
| Position(s)
| Games
| Tests
| Tries
| Goals
| F/Goals
| Points
|-
|- bgcolor="#FFFFFF"
| Gary Belcher
|  Canberra Raiders
| 
| 5
| 2
| 3
| 10
| –
| 32
|-
|- bgcolor="#FFFFFF"
| Martin Bella
|  Manly-Warringah Sea Eagles
| 
| 5
| 2
| –
| –
| –
| –
|-
|- bgcolor="#FFFFFF"
| Willie Carne
|  Brisbane Broncos
| 
| 5
| 2
| 8
| –
| –
| 32
|-
|- bgcolor="#FFFFFF"
| Bradley Clyde
|  Canberra Raiders
| 
| 4
| 2
| 3
| –
| –
| 12
|-
|- bgcolor="#FFFFFF"
| Gary Coyne
|  Canberra Raiders
| 
| 4
| 2
| –
| –
| –
| –
|-
|- bgcolor="#FFFFFF"
| Andrew Ettingshausen
|  Cronulla-Sutherland Sharks
| 
| 4
| 2
| 3
| –
| –
| 12
|-
|- bgcolor="#FFFFFF"
| Brad Fittler
|  Penrith Panthers
| 
| 5
| 2
| 4
| –
| –
| 16
|-
|- bgcolor="#FFFFFF"
| Andrew Gee
|  Brisbane Broncos
| 
| 1
| 0
| –
| –
| –
| –
|-
|- bgcolor="#FFFFFF"
| Scott Gourley
|  St George Dragons
| 
| 4
| 1
| 3
| –
| –
| 12
|-
|- bgcolor="#FFFFFF"
| Peter Jackson
|  North Sydney Bears
| 
| 4
| 1
| 3
| –
| –
| 12
|-
|- bgcolor="#FFFFFF"
| Chris Johns
|  Brisbane Broncos
| 
| 5
| 2
| 2
| –
| –
| 8
|-
|- bgcolor="#FFFFFF"
| Glenn Lazarus
|  Canberra Raiders
| 
| 5
| 2
| 1
| –
| –
| 4
|-
|- bgcolor="#FFFFFF"
| Cliff Lyons
|  Manly-Warringah Sea Eagles
| 
| 5
| 2
| 3
| –
| –
| 12
|-
|- bgcolor="#FFFFFF"
| Mark McGaw
|  Cronulla-Sutherland Sharks
| 
| 1
| 0
| –
| –
| –
| –
|-
|- bgcolor="#FFFFFF"
| Bruce McGuire
|  Canterbury-Bankstown Bulldogs
| 
| 1
| 0
| –
| –
| –
| –
|-
|- bgcolor="#FFFFFF"
| Mal Meninga (c)
|  Canberra Raiders
| 
| 3
| 2
| 2
| 6
| –
| 20
|-
|- bgcolor="#FFFFFF"
| Steve Roach
|  Balmain Tigers
| 
| 1
| 0
| –
| –
| –
| –
|-
|- bgcolor="#FFFFFF"
| Ian Roberts
|  Manly-Warringah Sea Eagles
| 
| 4
| 1
| –
| –
| –
| 4
|-
|- bgcolor="#FFFFFF"
| Craig Salvatori
|  Eastern Suburbs Roosters
| 
| 1
| –
| –
| –
| –
| –
|-
|- bgcolor="#FFFFFF"
| Geoff Toovey
|  Manly-Warringah Sea Eagles
| 
| 5
| 2
| 1
| –
| –
| 4
|-
|- bgcolor="#FFFFFF"
| Kerrod Walters
|  Brisbane Broncos
| 
| 4
| 2
| –
| –
| –
| –
|-
|- bgcolor="#FFFFFF"
| Kevin Walters
|  Brisbane Broncos
| 
| 5
| 2
| 1
| –
| –
| 4
|-
|- bgcolor="#FFFFFF"
| Rod Wishart
|  Illawarra Steelers
| 
| 4
| 2
| 4
| 4
| –
| 24
|-

Tour
The Australian's played five games on the tour, winning all five.

Northern Zone:  David Buko, Tweedy Malagian, Charlie Vee, John Markham, Lance Tirava, Elison Ketauwo, David Gilpu, Mathias Kin, Michael Matmillo, Patrick Kiap, Nande Yer, John Piel (c), Goro Arigae. Res - Joe Tonar, Chris Sari, Jacob Danny, Dick Moiga.

Australia:  Gary Belcher, Willie Carne, Mal Meninga (c), Andrew Ettingshausen, Rod Wishart, Peter Jackson, Geoff Toovey, Martin Bella, Kevin Walters, Glenn Lazarus, Craig Salvatori, Ian Roberts, Bradley Clyde. Res - Cliff Lyons, Brad Fittler, Chris Johns, Scott Gourley.

Australian forward Craig Salvatori suffered an ankle injury during the game and did not play again on tour.

Island Zone:  Normyle Eremas, Arnold Tivelit, Henry Hairoi, August Joseph, James Kapia, Willie Langer, Billy Kennedy, Pisai Maevo, Bernard Bate, David Gaius, Jimmy Peter, Ben Lakur, Apelis Walia. Res - Phillip Nagatia, Ken Oki, Cliff Rich, Albert Levy.

Australia:  Gary Belcher (c), Willie Carne, Peter Jackson, Brad Fittler, Chris Johns, Cliff Lyons, Kevin Walters, Steve Roach, Kerrod Walters, Glenn Lazarus, Gary Coyne, Andrew Gee, Scott Gourley. Res - Geoff Toovey, Martin Bella, Ian Roberts, Andrew Ettingshausen.

1st Test
Reserve forward Scott Gourley who had made 5 rugby union test appearances for Australia in 1988 before switching to rugby league with St. George, became Australia's 41st dual-rugby international.

Highlands Zone:  John Okul, Francis Abba, David Gomia, Thomas Tumbo, Joe Rema, Dimbi Ongugo, Gigmai Ongugo, Leslie Hoffman, Maima Kawage, Yami Kamisive, Joe Paraka (c), Philip Humar, John Yawing. Res - Michael Angra, Mek Kepo, John Passigan, Michael Kiap.

Australia:  Gary Belcher, Willie Carne, Chris Johns, Mark McGaw, Rod Wishart, Cliff Lyons, Geoff Toovey, Glenn Lazarus, Kevin Walters, Gary Coyne, Bruce McGuire, Scott Gourley, Bradley Clyde (c). Res - Kerrod Walters, Martin Bella, Brad Fittler, Peter Jackson.

Australia won a bruising encounter 28–3 over Highlands Zone in Mount Hagan.

2nd Test
This test match also doubled as a Group Stage game for the 1989-92 Rugby League World Cup. Gary Belcher, Martin Bella, Cliff Lyons and Gary Coyne all played their last tests for Australia.

Statistics
Leading Try Scorer
 8 by Willie Carne

Leading Point Scorer
 32 by Gary Belcher (3 tries, 10 goals) and Willie Carne (8 tries)

Largest Attendance
 17,000 - First test vs Papua New Guinea at Lloyd Robson Oval

Largest non-test Attendance
 10,300 - Australia vs Northern Zone

References

External links

Rugby league tours of Papua New Guinea
Australia national rugby league team tours
Kangaroo tour of Papua New Guinea
Kangaroo tour of Papua New Guinea